A pentode transistor is any transistor having five active terminals.

Early pentode transistors
One early pentode transistor was developed in the early 1950s as an improvement over the point-contact transistor.
A point-contact transistor having three emitters. It became obsolete in the middle 1950s.
Pentode field-effect transistors having 3 gates, similar to vacuum tube pentodes have also been described

Modern pentode transistors
Triple emitter transistor in three input transistor-transistor logic gates.
Triple collector transistor in three output integrated injection logic gates.
Field effect transistor having three gates.

References

Transistor types